Arthur B. Groos (born 5 February 1943 in Fullerton, California) is an American philologist, musicologist, medievalist and Germanist. 

Groos began teaching at Cornell University in 1973, held the Avalon Foundation Professorship in Humanities, and was granted emeritus status upon retirement. He was co-editor of the Cambridge Opera Journal alongside Roger Parker. A Festschrift was published in Groos's honor in 2020.

Selected publications
Groos, Arthur. Romancing the Grail: Genre, Science, and Quest in Wolfram's "Parzival." New York: Cornell University, 1995.

References

1943 births
Living people
American philologists
Germanists
American medievalists
American musicologists
Cornell University faculty
20th-century American male writers
21st-century American male writers
Writers from California
People from Fullerton, California